Wien Speising is a railway station serving Hietzing, the thirteenth district of Vienna.

References 

Railway stations in Vienna
Austrian Federal Railways